Eumorpha elisa is a moth of the  family Sphingidae.

Distribution 
It is known from Mexico and Guatemala.

Description 
Adults are greenish-grey and recognizable by the rhombiform patch on the posterior margin of the hindwing upperside with dark basal and distal edges. The forewing upperside ground colour is greyish-brown with darker greenish-grey markings.

Biology 
The larvae probably feed on grape and vine species.

References

Eumorpha
Moths described in 1901